Giovanni Paolo Marana or sometimes Jean-Paul Marana (1642 - 1693) was a writer of both fiction and non-fiction, best remembered for his conviction for failing to reveal a conspiracy to cede the Genoese town of Savona to the Duchy of Savoy.

Biography
Marana was born in Genoa to a wealthy family. In 1672, Carlo Emanuele II, Duke of Savoy, sought to expand his domains by occupying the town of Savona. For this purpose, he enlisted Raffaele Della Torre, a condotierre, who hired men, many unsalacious, to betray the town from within. Marana apparently knew of the plot, but failed to inform the authorities, causing his imprisonment for four years. In prison, he worked on the translation of the complete works of Seneca, as well as an encoded system of writing.

Once released, he moved to France, where he was pensioned by King Louis XIV, a ally of Savoy. He returned to Italy in 1689. He published in 1682 a chronicle of the Congiura de Rafaello della Torre.

Letters Writ by a Turkish Spy
Marana is the author of Letters Writ by a Turkish Spy, an epistolary novel  that judges the history and manners of Europe, especially of France, of his time from an Oriental perspective. This book was published in Italian in 1684 and in French in 1686.

The French writer and philosopher Montesquieu also drew on this book in his Persian Letters, an epistolary novel published in 1721 criticising the existing absolute monarchy in France in his own time.

Works
 Letters Writ by a Turkish Spy
 La Congiura di Raffaello della Torre con le mosse della Savoia contro la Republica di Genova, In Lione : Alla spese dell'auctore, 1682.  (in Italian)
 Lettre d'un Sicilien à un de ses amis (Letter of a Sicilian to one of his friends), Paris, A. Quantin, 1883.  - Read online (in French)
 L'espion du Grand-Seigneur, et ses relations secrètes envoyées au divan de Constantinople, et découvertes à Paris, pendant le règne de Louis le Grand: contenant les événements les plus considérables arrivés pendant la vie de Louis le Grand, Amsterdam: H. Wetstein and H. Des Bordes, 1684.  (in French)
 Dialogo fra Genova, et Algieri, città fulminate dal Giove Gallico, Amsterdamo : Desbordes, 1685.  - Read online (in Italian)
 Dialogue De Genes et d'Algers Villes foudroyées, Par les Armes Invincibles de Louis Le Grand L'Année 1684 : Avec plusieurs particularitez historiques touchant le juste ressentiment de ce Monarque, et ses prétensions sur la Ville de Genes, avec les réponces des Genois,	Amsterdam: Desbordes, 1685.  (the previous book in French)

Notes and references 

 French Wikipedia page for Giovanni Paolo Marana

Bibliography 
Isabelle Billaud and Marie-Catherine Laperrière, Représentations du corps sous l'Ancien Régime: discours et pratiques, Presses Université Laval, 2007. 
 Giovanni Paolo Marana,  Rosalind Ballaster, Fables of the East: selected tales, 1662-1785, Oxford University Press, 2005. 
Roland Mortier et Hervé Hasquin, Etudes sur le XVIIIe siècle, Editions de l'Université de Bruxelles, 1974. , p. 27 ss.
Gian Carlo Roscioni, Sulle tracce dell'esploratore turco, Milano, Rizzoli, 1992

External links 

 Salvatore Rotta, Marana, biblioteca dell’egoista.
 online works of Giovanni Paolo Marana in Internet Archive

1642 births
1693 deaths
17th-century Italian writers
17th-century French male writers
Writers from Genoa
French male novelists
17th-century French novelists
Italian male novelists
Nobility from Genoa